The 2003–04 season is the 94th season of competitive football by Ayr United.

Competitions

Pre season

Scottish First Division

Matches

Scottish Challenge Cup

Scottish League Cup

Scottish Cup

West Sound Trophy

Stats

League table

Results summary

Results by round

References

Ayr United F.C. seasons
Ayr United